Jesper Kristensen (born 9 October 1971) is a Danish former professional footballer, who made 129 appearances for Danish team Brøndby IF in the midfielder position. He played four games for the Denmark national football team, with whom he won the 1995 King Fahd Cup.

Born in Esbjerg, Kristensen started his career with lower league club Esbjerg fB. In the summer 1991, he moved to defending Danish champions Brøndby IF. He was named 1993 "Danish U21 Player of the Year", and made his Danish national team debut in April 1994. He helped Brøndby win the 1994 Danish Cup trophy, and was a part of the Danish team which won the King Fahd Cup in January 1995. He played a few matches in Brøndby's 1995–96 Superliga winning season, before he had to prematurely end his career in August 1995, due to injuries. He played a total 129 games for Brøndby, including 103 games and 11 goals in the Superliga.

Honours
Brøndby
Danish Superliga: 1995–96
Danish Cup: 1993–94

Denmark
FIFA Confederations Cup: 1995

References

External links
Danish national team profile
 Brøndby IF profile

1971 births
Living people
Danish men's footballers
Danish Superliga players
Esbjerg fB players
Brøndby IF players
Denmark international footballers
Denmark under-21 international footballers
1995 King Fahd Cup players
FIFA Confederations Cup-winning players
People from Esbjerg
Association football midfielders
Sportspeople from the Region of Southern Denmark